Mian Jamshed ud Din (31 March 1955 – 3 June 2020) was a Pakistani politician hailing from Nowshera District.

Biography
Belonging to the Pakistan Tehreek-e-Insaf, he served as the Minister for Excise & Taxation in the 10th Khyber Pakhtunkhwa Assembly.

Death
On 3 June 2020 Kakakhel died from COVID-19 during the COVID-19 pandemic in Pakistan.

According to media reports, Jamshed Ud Din, 65, had been undergoing treatment for several days and was on a ventilator at the Kalsoom Hospital in Islamabad.

External links

References

1955 births
2020 deaths
Khyber Pakhtunkhwa MPAs 2013–2018
People from Nowshera District
Pakistan Tehreek-e-Insaf MPAs (Khyber Pakhtunkhwa)
Deaths from the COVID-19 pandemic in Islamabad